Telecommunications in Saint Vincent and the Grenadines is accomplished through the transmission of information by various types of technologies within Saint Vincent and the Grenadines, mainly telephones, radio, television, and the Internet.

Telephone
Telephones - main lines in use: 12,483 (2020)

Telephones - mobile cellular: 102,700 (2019)

Telephone system:
domestic: fixed-line teledensity exceeds 11 per 100 persons and mobile-cellular teledensity is about 87 per 100 persons
international: landing points for the ECFS, CARCIP and Southern Caribbean Fiber submarine cables providing connectivity to US and Caribbean Islands; connectivity also provided by VHF/UHF radiotelephone from Saint Vincent to Barbados; SHF radiotelephone to Grenada and Saint Lucia; access to Intelsat earth station in Martinique through Saint Lucia

Radio
Radio broadcast stations: AM 0 (ZBG-AM 700 went off air in 2010), FM 3, shortwave 0 (1998)

Radios: 77,000 (1997)

Television
Television broadcast stations: 1 (plus five repeaters) (2020)

Televisions: 18,000 (1997)

Internet
Internet Service Providers (ISPs): Cable and Wireless/FLOW

Country code (Top level domain): VC

See also
History of telecommunication
Outline of telecommunication

References

External links
 National Telecommunications Regulatory Commission for Saint Vincent and the Grenadines
 Eastern Caribbean Telecommunications Authority (ECTEL)
 Saint Vincent and the Grenadines, SubmarineCableMap.com

Saint Vincent and the Grenadines
 
Saint Vincent